The Roman Catholic Archdiocese of Đakovo-Osijek is an archdiocese of the Latin Church of the Roman Catholic Church in Croatia.

The archdiocese is centred on the city of Đakovo, in Croatia.

Đuro Hranić was appointed Archbishop on 18 April 2013 by Pope Francis following the resignation of Marin Srakić.

The Archdiocese currently has two suffragans: the Diocese of Požega, and the Diocese of Srijem.

History
Originally erected in the 4th century as the diocese of Syrmia, the diocese was united with the Diocese of Bosnia in July 1773, when it was named the Diocese of Bosnia or Ðakovo and Srijem (Bosniensis seu Diacovensis et Sirmiensis). In 1963, the diocese was renamed to the diocese of Đakovo or Bosnia and Srijem (Diacovensis seu Bosnensis et Sirmiensis).

It was elevated to an Archdiocese on July 18, 2008 by Pope Benedict XVI, renamed to the Archdiocese of Đakovo-Osijek and the new Diocese of Srijem was split off, and made a suffragan. The new Archdiocese also received the Diocese of Požega, as its second suffragan.

Ordinaries

Diocese of Sirmio
Latin Name: Sirmiensis
Erected: 4th Century

Petar (around 1374)
...
Konrad Schnosputger, O.S.A. (26 Jul 1433 - 1436 Died)
...
Giacomo Piceno, O.F.M. (1454 - 1459 Died)
Orbán (22 Apr 1460 - 1465 Died)
...
Miklós Báthori (8 Jan 1473 - 22 Apr 1474 Appointed, Bishop of Vác)
Zsigmond Palóczy (5 Apr 1475 - 1479 Died)
Boldizsár (25 Jun 1479 - 1481 Died)
János Vitéz (31 Mar 1482 - 3 Jun 1489 Appointed, Bishop of Veszprém)
Stjepan Crispo (26 Feb 1490 - )
Mikuláš Csáky (de Bačka) (29 Apr 1499 - 5 Jun 1501 Appointed, Bishop of Nitra)
Gabril Polgar (30 May 1502 - )
István de Szatmar (2 Sep 1502 - 1505 Died)
János Ország de Guth ( 1505 - 1520 Appointed, Bishop of Vác)
László de Macedonia (Dec 1520 - 1526 Resigned)
Stjepan Brodarić (11 Mar 1526 - 30 May 1539 Appointed, Bishop of Vác)
Márton Pethe de Hetes (1582 - 26 Oct 1583 Appointed, Bishop of Vác)
Štefan da Trnava, O.S.P.P.E. (20 Mar 1589 - 1592 Died)
Miklós Zelniczey Naprady (1593 - 17 Jun 1596 Appointed, Bishop of Pécs)
Šimun Bratulić, O.S.P.P.E. (15 Jan 1601 - 13 Sep 1604 Appointed, Bishop of Zagreb)
László Majthényi (18 May 1616 - 1624 Died)
Francesco Jany (1 Jul 1697 - Apr 1702 Died)
Joseph Antoine Marie Favini, O.F.M. Conv. (14 May 1703 - 22 Nov 1717 Died)
Franjo Vernić (22 Nov 1717 - 27 Jun 1729 Died)
Gabriel Patačić (12 Feb 1731 - 28 Sep 1733 Appointed, Archbishop of Kalocsa)
Ladislav Szörényi (15 Feb 1734 - 13 Nov 1752 Died)
Nicolò Givovich (13 Nov 1752 - 16 May 1762 Died)
Ivan Krstitelj Paxy (20 Dec 1762 - 10 Sep 1770 Confirmed, Bishop of Zagreb)
...

Diocese of Bosna (Djakovo) et Srijem
United: 9 July 1773 with the Diocese of Bosnia
Latin Name: Bosniensis seu Diacovensis et Sirmiensis
Metropolitan: Archdiocese of Zagreb

Anton Mandić (26 Aug 1806 - 11 Jan 1815 Died)
Emeric Karol Raffay (22 Jul 1816 - 10 Jan 1830 Died)
Pál Mátyás Szutsits (28 Feb 1831 - 13 Apr 1834 Died)
Josip Kuković (30 Sep 1834 - 2 Dec 1849 Resigned)
Josip Juraj Strossmayer (20 May 1850 - 8 Apr 1905 Died)
Ivan Baptista Krapàc (24 May 1910 - 15 Jul 1916 Died)
Anton Akšamović (22 Apr 1920 - 28 Mar 1942 Resigned)
Stjepan Bauerlein (12 Oct 1959 - 10.  November 1980.Resigned due to reaching the canonical age )

Diocese of Djakovo o Bosna i Srijem
Name Changed: 18 November 1963
Latin Name: Diacovensis seu Bosnensis et Sirmiensis
Metropolitan: Archdiocese of Zagreb

Ćiril Kos (6 Feb 1974 - 6 Feb 1997 Retired)
Marin Srakić (6 Feb 1997 Succeeded - 18 Apr 2013 Retired)

Archdiocese of Ðakovo-Osijek
18 June 2008: Elevated and Separated into the Archdiocese of Ðakovo-Osijek and the Diocese of Srijem
Latin Name: Diacovensis seu Bosnensis et Sirmiensis
Metropolitan: Archdiocese of Zagreb

Đuro Hranić (18 Apr 2013 - )

References

External links 
Diocese of Đakovo
http://www.catholic-hierarchy.org/diocese/ddjak.html

Dioceses established in the 4th century
Dakovo